Racine is a census-designated place (CDP) in Boone County, West Virginia, United States. As of the 2010 census, its population was 256.

The community was named after Racine, Ohio, the native home of first settlers.

The John Slack Park is also located in Racine next to the Fire Department.

References

Census-designated places in Boone County, West Virginia
Census-designated places in West Virginia
Charleston, West Virginia metropolitan area